 was a Japanese photographer famous for portraits and nudes.

Ōtake was born in Yokosuka (which later became Ōsuka, then Kakegawa), Shizuoka on 15 May 1920, the oldest son of a father who worked in the sake industry and a mother who performed on the koto and (transverse) flute. The boy's mother died when he was six, and he moved to the house of his father's elder sister, his younger brother moved to another house, both in Yokosuka, while his father tried and failed in the transportation industry and quickly moved to Tokyo. A year later, the boy moved to the house of a rich family, still in Yokosuka. He started at school, quickly showing an aptitude for drawing, gaining a special mention in a national contest.

Shōji  moved to Tokyo with his father in 1928, living in Nippori with his father's new wife. He became a keen photographer when very young.

Ōtake joined the army, but was able to work as a photographer. In 1947 he managed to attach himself to GHQ, for which he photographed singers and actresses at the Ernie Pyle Theatre. From 1949 he became involved in a succession of photographic organizations, as he continued work as a photojournalist. Starting in 1951, he spent five years photographing classical and other musicians from around the world during their stays in Japan; these photographs were published in Asahi Camera  and in 1955 were collected in the highly praised book World Musicians. He was also publishing nude photographs in the magazines Camera and Photo Art.

From the 1950s through the 1970s, Ōtake moved to become the top photographer of women in Japan. For five years from 1971, Ōtake photographed housewives and "OL" nude (sometimes together with their babies or small children, also nude) on Nippon Television; this work too was later collected into books.

By the 1980s, Ōtake's fame and commercial success as a portraitist and photographer of nudes had eclipsed his earlier and very different work. Republication within the volume dedicated to him of the series "Shōwa Shashin Zenshigoto" (1982), and the publication the following year of Haruka naru uta, brought it great acclaim.

Besides photography, Ōtake has also worked as television screenwriter and an essayist. As a photographer, he remained active into his late 80s.

Among the photographers who have trained under Ōtake are Mineko Orisaku and Sanae Numata.

Books

Books devoted to Ōtake's work

Sekai no ongakuka / World Musicians. Tokyo: Asahi Shinbunsha, 1955.   
Onna no naka no onna. Tokyo: Geibunsha, 1969.   
Janetto Janet. Tokyo: Nippon Camera-sha, 1974.   
Teru hi kumoru hi. Tokyo: Nippon Camera-sha, 1976.   
Famirī nūdo. Tokyo: Asahi Sonorama, 1977.   
Sekai no ongakuka / Musicians of the World. Sonorama Shashin Sensho 18. Tokyo: Asahi Sonorama, 1979.   
Ōtake Shōji. Shōwa Shashin Zenshigoto 4. Tokyo: Asahi Shinbunsha, 1982. A survey of Ōtake's career, interspersed with interviews, essays, etc.  
"Onna" 101 nin no shōzō. Tokyo: Kōdansha, 1982.   
Haruka naru uta. Tokyo: Kirihara Shoten, 1983. A collection of Ōtake's early work.  
Ranjuku no gogatsu midori. Tokyo: Kōdansha, 1983. .   
Onna no te ga himitsu o kataru: Boku no tesō tanbōki. Wani no Hon. Tokyo: Besutoserāzu, 1984. .   
Hana nareba: Razō. Nihon Geijutsu Shuppansha, 1985.   
Shōji Ōtake kansō jinsei taidan: Bijo to binan ni zūmuin. Tokyo: Kōdansha, 1985. .   
Josei shashin seminā-shū. Tokyo: Nippon Camera-sha, 1989. .   
Shōji Ōtake sakuhinshū: Haruka naru uta. JCII Photo Salon Library 8. Tokyo: JCII Photo Salon, 1991. Exhibition catalogue.    
Asakura Miki / Si. 1993. Photo book of the singer . Tokyo: Sukora, 1993. .  
Shinpen Haruka naru uta. Tokyo: Nippon Camera-sha, 1993. .   
Sasurai hana. Photo book of the singer . Take Shobō, 1994. .  
Shōji Ōtake sakuhinshū: Shōwa gunzō. JCII Photo Salon Library 75. Tokyo: JCII Photo Salon, 1997. Exhibition catalogue.    
Shōwa gunzō Tokyo: Nippon Camera-sha, 1997. . A collection of Ōtake's black and white portraits from the 1950s to the 1980s, with an emphasis on earlier material.  
Shōji Ōtake no "renzu kansōgaku": Raika renzu to kōseiha renzu. Supplement to Asahi Camera, December 1998.  
Haruka naru kagami: Aru shashinka no shōgen. Tokyo: Tōkyō Shinbun Shuppankyoku, 1998. .   
Haruka naru kagami: Shashin de tsuzuru haisen-Nihon hiwa. Chūō Bunko. Tokyo: Chūō-Kōron-sha, 2000. .  
Jidai no kao. Tokyo: Asahi Shinbunsha, 2002. Portraits.  
Akasaka Hinokichō Tekisasu Hausu (Akasaka Hinoki-chō Texas House). Tokyo: Asahi Shinbunsha, 2006. . Text and photographs by Ōtake, who looks back at his time with the television and other stars of the 1960s in an Asakusa apartment dubbed Texas House.   
Ōtake Shōji no renzu kansōgaku: Kyōrikei-yō renzu hen (Shōji Ōtake's study of the effects of lenses: Lenses for rangefinder cameras). Kurashikku Kamera Sensho 37. Tokyo: Asahi Sonorama, 2006. .

Other books showing Ōtake's work
Nihon nūdo meisakushū (Japanese nudes). Camera Mainichi bessatsu. Tokyo: Mainichi Shinbunsha, 1982.  Pp. 126–29 show nudes by Ōtake, 1949–61.  
Shashinka wa nani o hyōgen shita ka: 1945–1960 (What were photographers expressing? 1945–1960). Tokyo: Konica Plaza, 1991.  Pp. 70–71 show three portraits of musicians by Ōtake.

Laserdisc

Shirubiannu: Ōtake Shōji no sekai / Sylviane.

Notes

Sources
Jinbō Kyōko. "Ōtake Shōji". Nihon shashinka jiten / 328 Outstanding Japanese Photographers. Kyoto: Tankōsha, 2000. . P.71.  Despite the English-language alternative title, all in Japanese.
"Nenpu" (chronology). Ōtake Shōji. Shōwa Shashin Zenshigoto 4. Tokyo: Asahi Shinbunsha, 1982. Pp. 158–59.

External links
Ono, Philbert. "Otake Shoji". PhotoGuide Japan. A very brief biography. 
Ōtake photographs at Fujifilm. Click on a photograph's caption to see it enlarged.  
Biographical information at Fujifilm. 

Japanese photographers
Portrait photographers
Artists from Shizuoka Prefecture
People from Kakegawa, Shizuoka
1920 births
2015 deaths
Writers on photographic techniques